George Gwozdecky (born July 17, 1953) is a Canadian ice hockey coach. He resigned as an assistant coach with the Tampa Bay Lightning of the National Hockey League (NHL) in June 2015. He has recently accepted a job as the head hockey coach at Valor Christian High School in Highlands Ranch, CO.

He was the head coach for the University of Denver Pioneers hockey team for 19 seasons, from 1994 until 2013. The Pioneers won 2 national championships (2004/2005) under his guidance, and won at least 20 games in each of the last 12 seasons in which he coached them. He joined the Pioneers as head coach in 1994.

He is a member of the prestigious Miami University "Cradle of Coaches", and is the only person to win the NCAA national championship as a player (with Wisconsin in 1977), assistant coach (at Michigan State in 1986), and head coach with Denver (2004 and 2005).

Gwozdecky is a native of Thunder Bay, Ontario.

Gwozdecky and his wife Bonnie have one daughter, Adrienne.

Head coaching record

See also
List of college men's ice hockey coaches with 400 wins

References

External links

1953 births
Living people
Denver Pioneers men's ice hockey coaches
Ice hockey coaches
Ice hockey people from Ontario
Michigan State Spartans ice hockey coaches
Sportspeople from Thunder Bay
Tampa Bay Lightning coaches
Wisconsin–River Falls Falcons men's ice hockey coaches
NCAA men's ice hockey national champions